Francis Derrick Procter Halliwell was Archdeacon of Bombay from 1963 until 1965.

Halliwell was educated at Durham University and St Augustine's College, Canterbury; and ordained in 1937.  After a curacy in New Eltham he was Chaplain at Hubli then Colaba before his time as Archdeacon and Vicar of Lee on the Solent afterwards.

References

Alumni of Durham University
Alumni of St Augustine's College, Canterbury
Archdeacons of Bombay